Grandmother Mountain is a mountain in the North Carolina High Country, near the community of Linville. It is wholly in the Pisgah National Forest and next to the Blue Ridge Parkway.  Its elevation reaches .  The mountain generates feeder streams for the Linville River.

On top of Grandmother Mountain is the WUNE-DT tower, broadcasting the University of North Carolina Public Television (UNC-TV/PBS) on channel 17.

Wilkes County 

See also
List of mountains in North Carolina

References

External links

 

Mountains of North Carolina
Blue Ridge Parkway
Protected areas of Avery County, North Carolina
Mountains of Avery County, North Carolina